General Edward Stopford Claremont CB (23 January 1819 – 16 July 1890) was a British soldier who was the United Kingdom's first military attaché, holding the post in Paris for 25 years.

Birth
Stopford Claremont was born in Paris with the name Edward Charles John Stopford, the illegitimate son of Lieutenant General Hon. Sir Edward Stopford and Anaïs Pauline Nathalie Aubert, known as Mademoiselle Anaïs, an actress in the Comédie-Française. His paternal grandfather was James Stopford, 2nd Earl of Courtown. James Stopford, 3rd Earl of Courtown refused to allow him to use the sole name of Stopford because of his illegitimate status and so he was naturalised in Britain by private act of Parliament in 1836 with the name of Edward Stopford Claremont.

Career
Stopford Claremont entered the British Army in 1838 as an Ensign in the Royal Regiment of Foot, promoted to Lieutenant in 1841 and Captain in the Royal Canadian Rifle Regiment in 1845. For "distinguished service" he was given brevet rank of Major in 1854. As "military commissioner" he was attached to the French army in 1855 during the Crimean War and was commended for his services by General Canrobert. Later that year he was given brevet Lieutenant-Colonel rank and awarded the CB. He was also with French forces during the Second Italian War of Independence in 1859 and the Franco-Prussian War in 1870–71.

The Emperor of the French said that Stopford Claremont was his favourite English officer and awarded him the Fourth Class of the Légion d'Honneur after the Crimean War, and later promoted him to the Third Class. The Ottoman Sultan gave him (along with many other British officers) the Order of the Medjidie, 4th class, in 1858, at which time he was described as "Military Attache to Her Majesty's Embassy at Paris". In 1862 the Queen gave him the further honour of Groom of the Privy Chamber. He was given the local rank of major-general in 1870, fully promoted the next year (backdated to 1868), and promoted again to Lieutenant-General in 1877.

Stopford Claremont retired in 1881 with the honorary rank of full General. He was honorary colonel of the Bedfordshire Regiment from 1883 until his death.

Family

In 1843 Edward Stopford Claremont married Frances Charlotte, daughter of General Sir George Wetherall. They had six children. He seems at some point to have had a liaison with a wealthy widow, Yolande Lyne-Stephens; his third son Henry changed his surname from Stopford Claremont to Lyne Stephens.

References
Obituary, The Times, London, 17 July 1890, page 5
General Edward Charles John Claremont CB (born Stopford), powys.org

External links

1819 births
1890 deaths
British diplomats
British Army personnel of the Crimean War
British Army generals
Companions of the Order of the Bath
Commandeurs of the Légion d'honneur
Recipients of the Order of the Medjidie, 4th class
Military personnel from Paris
Naturalised citizens of the United Kingdom
Burials in England
British military attachés